Árpád von Nahodyl (born 8 February 1958) is a German writer, neopagan activist and politician. His books on pagan subjects are published under the pseudonym Géza von Neményi. Active in Germany's neopagan scene since the early 1980s, he founded the Heidnische Gemeinschaft which attracted media attention and controversy in that decade. After leaving the organization, he founded the Germanische Glaubens-Gemeinschaft in 1991. Nahodyl has also been involved in local politics for several parties, most recently Alternative for Germany.

Early life 
Árpád von Nahodyl was born in Cologne, West Germany. He grew up in West Berlin. He has a degree in visual communication from the Berlin University of the Arts.

Pagan revivalism 
In 1982, Nahodyl advertised for people interested in studying mythology and performing pagan rites. A small group was formed. Due to the isolation of West Berlin, the group came to study local history and tried to localize historical cult sites in the city. The group had a romantic conception of paganism. It characterized it as a nature religion and treated witchcraft as a synonym for folk religion. The group was eventually formalized as the Heidnische Gemeinschaft (Pagan Community).

In the mid-1980s, Nahodyl's group came to the attention of journalists, who called it a cult and associated it with the 1978 Jonestown mass murder. City officials, church officials and newspapers such as Bild-Zeitung (24 February 1984) and Der Spiegel (7 January 1985) alleged that the group was based on Nazi ideology, due to its Germanic imagery and interest in German history. The group was not specifically political, although some members did maintain far-right contacts. Nahodyl, under his pseudonym Géza von Neményi, began to appear in public at events in an attempt to explain what the group was about. Journalists, politicians and other neopagans associated Neményi with Ariosophy and blood and soil ideology, so the group remained controversial in the German mainstream.

Having left the Heidnische Gemeinschaft, Neményi founded the organization Germanische Glaubens-Gemeinschaft (GGG) in 1991. The GGG took its name from Germany's first Germanic neopagan organization, which had been founded by Ludwig Fahrenkrog before World War I and became defunct in 1964. The practices of Neményi's GGG have included recitations of hymns from the Rigveda and belief in reincarnation. The organization has been influenced by Theosophy and New Age, from which it absorbed concepts from Gnosticism and neoshamanism.

In 2003, Neményi became the centre of a controversy when he launched himself as the highest authority for all "traditional pagans" in the country. He gave himself the title Allsherjargode, derived from the medieval Icelandic title allsherjargoði. Neményi argued that this institution would solve the problems caused by the failures to establish an umbrella organization for German pagans. The move was met with fierce resistance within the German neopagan scene.

Among the books written under the name Géza von Neményi are Heidnische Naturreligion. Altüberlieferte Glaubensvorstellungen, Riten und Bräuche (1988), Heidentum und NS-Ideologie (1997) and Heilige Runen. Zauberzeichen des Nordens (2004).

Political activity
In the 1980s, Nahodyl was a board member for the Berlin section of the Green Party. In 1985, he along with his brother came under investigation during a purge of party members with far-right sympathies. Both brothers denied having any such sympathies, but were still expelled from the party. After this Nahodyl was active in the Social Democratic Party for a period. In 2014, he was a candidate for Alternative for Germany in the local elections in Bad Belzig.

See also
 Modern paganism and New Age
 Neopaganism in German-speaking Europe

References

Sources

Further reading

External links
Allsherjargode website 

1958 births
Living people
Writers from Berlin
German modern pagans
Modern pagan writers
Founders of modern pagan movements
Adherents of Germanic neopaganism
20th-century German writers
21st-century German writers
German non-fiction writers
Alliance 90/The Greens politicians
Social Democratic Party of Germany politicians
Alternative for Germany politicians